Rabbitte is an Irish surname. Notable people with the name include:

Anne Rabbitte (born 1970), Irish Fianna Fáil politician
Darragh Rabbitte (born 1980), Irish hurler 
Joe Rabbitte (born 1970), Irish hurler
Pat Rabbitte (born 1949), Irish Labour Party politician
The Rabbitte family, fictional family of The Barrytown Trilogy by Roddy Doyle

See also
Rabbitt (disambiguation)
Rabbit (disambiguation)

Surnames of Irish origin